The Yamaha RX-135 (also popularly known under the name RX-King or RX-K or  or RXT simply RX in Southeast Asia, especially India, Indonesia, & the philippines) is a two-stroke engine motorcycle produced by Yamaha since the 1990's.

The RX-135 was released around the end of the 1990s. In selected India cities, a factory-shipped RX-135 could be bought until August 2009. There were two versions of the bike sold in India — a four-speed version and a five-speed version. The 4-speed produced a power of 12 horsepower and the 5-speed version produced 14 horsepower.

In Indonesia, the RX-135, initially called as RX-K, was produced in 1981–82. The new 1983 model, which added a cubical tank design and a new more modern seat model, was released as the RX King - with a claimed power of 18.5 hp.  It was produced until late 2009, when the requirements of the EURO3 regulation halted production. The late model RX-135 in Indonesia used a catalytic converter as part of the exhaust, which made it pass EURO2 regulations.

The RX-135 had also been initially introduced as RXG with similar engine capacity but with numerous changes in bottom-end gearing (primary ratio), sprockets and cylinder design, sticker design, ignition system and general looks.

In the Philippines the rx-135 is called RXT it started production in 1992. It has notable differences from its Indian counterpart such as rectangular shaped headlight instead of circle, taillight bracket placed differently, & fuel tank cap. The RXT135 ended production in 2007 with the introduction of euro 2 emission standards.The Engine casing of the Indian version of RX135 5 speed and 4 speed post 2005 was designed differently as compared to earlier versions. The catalytic converter design post 2005 was also of a light and sleeker design.

RX135

There are no more being produced as it was a two stroke engine and the two stroke engines were banned.